

Chapter list
The following schools have had chapters of Beta Beta Beta.

References

Beta Beta Beta
chapters